Tom Rosenthal (born 26 August 1986) is an English singer-songwriter and composer. His music has been described as "short, expertly crafted pop songs".

Music 
Rosenthal has released 6 albums to date, all of them self-released on his own label Tinpot Records. Keep a Private Room Behind the Shop was released in 2011, and the latest is Denis Was A Bird in 2021, written about his father's death. His songs have had over 350 million streams on Spotify. 

Rosenthal's makes videos for his songs that he posts on YouTube and Vimeo. His video for "Watermelon" was noted in the Top 30 music videos of 2014 by The Huffington Post as, "Best use of a grown man in a watermelon suit. (*Close call though.)" 

Rosenthal's  music has been used on television soundtracks. "Forgets Slowly", "Lights on But Nobody's Home", and "Take Care" featured in the Skins episode "Alo". "Go Solo" was featured on the soundtrack of the German film Head Full of Honey (2014), the documentary Kid Poker (2015), the NFL documentary Hard Knocks, the film trailer for Felix and Meira, and the Netflix documentary The Least Expected Day: Inside the Movistar Team 2019. "It's OK" features on the film trailers for Comet (2014), Anesthesia (2014). and L'odyssée (2016) From 2016 through to 2018 his songs It's OK and Woes have been used on Neighbours. 

Rosenthal's song "Go Solo" featured in a TV commercial for the Renault Zoe E-TRON in 2021 and in a 2022 episode of the NBC drama series New Amsterdam.

Rosenthal played his first concert at St Pancras Old Church on Wednesday 13 March 2019, followed by a tour around Europe and a gig at Union Chapel, with over 40 concerts in 2019. 

Rosenthal recorded a cover version of the single "Home" in 2015, followed by an album of covers called Stop Stealing the Covers! in 2020 under the pseudonym Edith Whiskers.

Personal life 
At age 4, Rosenthal's daughter Fenn composed the song "Dinosaurs in Love", which went viral on the Internet in 2020. 

Rosenthal co-founded the UK charity Grand Plan, which funds four grants of £1,000 to artists of colour looking to realise a creative project.

Discography

Albums

Extended plays

Compilation albums

Non-album singles

References

1986 births
Living people
Alumni of Durham University
English male singer-songwriters